Neapolis was a town in ancient Isauria. It became a bishopric: no longer the seat of a residential bishop, it remains, under the name of Neapolis in Isauria, a titular see of the Roman Catholic Church.

Its site is unlocated.

References

Populated places in ancient Isauria
Roman towns and cities in Turkey
Former populated places in Turkey
Populated places of the Byzantine Empire
Catholic titular sees in Asia
Lost ancient cities and towns